is one of Japan's largest door-to-door delivery service companies, with a market share of 41%, competing closely with Sagawa Express and Nippon Express. Their head office is in Ginza, Tokyo. Takkyūbin is sometimes used in Japan as a generic term for all express home delivery services, but the company defends the trademark to avoid it becoming genericized.

The company's logo is a yellow oval with a black cat carrying her kitten in her mouth, symbolizing the company's promise that they take care of items entrusted to them as though the items were their own family. The company is often colloquially referred to as 黒ねこ (Kuroneko) which means "black cat" in Japanese. The logo is as familiar in Japan as the Coca-Cola logo is in the United States.  The logo was developed by founder Yasuomi Ogura.

Gallery

References

 Yamato Holdings Annual Report 2008 
 Yamato Holdings Annual Report 2019

External links

Yamato Transport
Yamato Transport USA
Yamato Holdings

Companies listed on the Tokyo Stock Exchange
Transport companies based in Tokyo
Logistics companies of Japan
Service companies based in Tokyo
Transport companies established in 1919
Japanese companies established in 1919